The 17th edition of the annual Hypo-Meeting took place on 15 and 16 June 1991 in Götzis, Austria. The track and field competition featured a men's decathlon and a women's heptathlon. The meeting was the most major combined events competition prior to the 1991 IAAF World Championships in Tokyo, Japan.

Men's Decathlon

Schedule

15 June

16 June

Records

Results

Women's Heptathlon

Schedule

15 June

16 June

Records

Notes

See also
1991 World Championships in Athletics – Men's decathlon
1991 World Championships in Athletics – Women's heptathlon

References
 decathlon2000
 decathlonfans
 1991 Year Ranking Decathlon

1991
Hypo-Meeting
Hypo-Meeting